Faridabad Lok Sabha constituency is one of the 10 Lok Sabha (parliamentary) constituencies in Haryana state in northern India.

Assembly segments

At present, Faridabad Lok Sabha constituency comprises nine Vidhan Sabha (legislative assembly) constituencies:

Members of Parliament
The Faridabad Lok Sabha constituency was created in 1977. The list of Member of Parliament (MP) is as follows:

Election Results

See also
 Faridabad district
 List of Constituencies of the Lok Sabha

Notes

Lok Sabha constituencies in Haryana
Faridabad district